Golapurab Brahmin (also sometimes called Galav) are Brahmin community in western Uttar Pradesh and Madhya Pradesh regions of India.

See also 
 Golapurva

References 

Brahmin communities of Madhya Pradesh
Brahmin communities of Uttar Pradesh